The Plains black-headed snake or Plains blackhead snake (Tantilla nigriceps) is a species of snake of the family Colubridae. Their ventral scales are white with a pink or orange mid-line. It is readily distinguished from the Chihuahuan (T. wilcoxi) and Yaqui (T. yaquia) black-headed snakes by the absence of a light neck collar.

Geographic range
The snake is found in the US states of Colorado, Texas, Kansas, Nebraska, Oklahoma, and New Mexico and in Mexico.

Habitat
They are often found in rocky or grassy prairies, or hillsides where the soil is moist. Occasionally they are found in basements.

Behavior
The Plains black-headed snake is often secretive and can be found seeking refuge in leaf-litter or in small burrows, while being surface active at night. It has been collected from February into September in Arizona, but most are found in August.  It is susceptible to desiccation and unlikely to be found surface active or under surface debris in dry periods or seasons.

Breeding
It is presumed that they lay up to three eggs in the spring or early summer, where hatchlings will begin to emerge during the summer.

References

Colubrids
Snakes of North America
Reptiles of Mexico
Reptiles of the United States
Reptiles described in 1860
Taxa named by Robert Kennicott